José Pedro Maldonado Maira (born 4 November 1994) is a Chilean field hockey player.

Personal life
José Maldonado comes from a hockey family, with his sister María also being a Chile international.

Career

Junior National Team
Maldonado was a member of the Chile Under 18 side at the 2010 Youth Olympics in Singapore.

Senior National Team
Maldonado made his senior international debut in 2013, in a Tri-Nations tournament in Elektrostal, Russia.

Since his debut, Maldonado has been a regular inclusion in the national team. His most notable performance was as a member of the team that won the Hockey Series Open in Santiago in September 2018.

References

1994 births
Living people
Chilean male field hockey players
South American Games medalists in field hockey
South American Games silver medalists for Chile
Competitors at the 2022 South American Games
2023 Men's FIH Hockey World Cup players
21st-century Chilean people